The men's association football tournament at the 2003 Indian Ocean Island Games (French: Jeux des îles de l'océan Indien 2003) held in Mauritius. Originally scheduled for Moroni, Comoros; moved to Mauritius

Teams

Group stage

Group A

Group B

Knockout stage

Semi-final

Third place match

Final

Medalists

Final ranking

Per statistical convention in football, matches decided in extra time are counted as wins and losses, while matches decided by penalty shoot-out are counted as draws.

See also
Indian Ocean Island Games
Football at the Indian Ocean Island Games

References
2003 MATCHES - AFRICA

2003
Indian Ocean Games 2003